The UCI Road World Championships Elite Women's Road Race is a one-day event for professional cyclists that takes place annually. The winner is considered the World Cycling Champion (or World Road Cycling Champion) and earns the right to wear the Rainbow Jersey for a full year in road race or stage events. The event is a single 'mass start' road race with the winner being the first across the line at the completion of the full race distance. The road race is contested by riders organized by national cycling teams as opposed to commercially sponsored or trade teams, which is the standard in professional cycling.

History
The UCI Road World Championships for women made its debut in Reims, France in 1958. Due to the Summer Olympics, the Road World Championships were not held in 1984, 1988 and 1992. 

Until about 1990, the race varied in length from a low of 46.6 km in 1966 to around 72 km (30 to 50 miles). From 1991, the race length began to gradually increase, first to 79 km (Stuttgart, Germany), and then to over 100 km in 1996 (Lugano, Switzerland).

The event can be held over either a relatively flat course which favors cycling sprinters or over a hilly course which favors more of a climbing specialist or all-round type of cyclist. It usually involves laps of a circuit, albeit with less laps than the Elite Men's race.

Historically, European nations have dominated this event.

Results

Most successful riders
Updated after the 2022 UCI Road World Championships

Medalists per nation
Updated after the 2022 UCI Road World Championships

References

 
Women's road race
Women's road bicycle races
Lists of UCI Road World Championships medalists